Plakophilin are proteins of the cytoskeleton. They are involved in regulating the adhesive activity of cadherin.

The three types of plakophilin proteins found in humans are PKP1, PKP2, and PKP3; all exhibiting dual localization in the nucleus as well as desmosomes.

Genes include:
 PKP1
 PKP2
 PKP3

See also 
 List of conditions caused by problems with junctional proteins

References 

Protein families
Cytoskeleton